Fabio Costa may refer to:

 Fabio Costa (composer, conductor) (born 1971), Brazilian-born composer/conductor 
 Fábio Costa (born 1977), Brazilian goalkeeper
 Fábio Bittencourt da Costa (born 1977), Brazilian football midfielder
 Fabio Costa, Brazilian designer who participated in Project Runway (season 10)